Scotland School District 4-3 is a public school district headquartered in Scotland, South Dakota.

It has elementary and middle/high school divisions.

References

External links
 
School districts in South Dakota
Bon Homme County, South Dakota